1918 Eighth Avenue is a  skyscraper in the Denny Regrade neighborhood of Seattle, in the U.S. state of Washington. It was completed in 2009 and has 36 floors, consisting mostly of office space. On August 25, 2008, the tower gained its first tenant, law firm Hagens Berman Sobol Shapiro. The firm leased  of the building.  The  building was developed by Schnitzer West, LLC and is now owned by an affiliate of JPMorgan Chase, which purchased it for $350 million after Schnitzer put it up for sale in May 2011, shortly after Amazon.com signed a long-term lease for more than two thirds of the office space.

See also
List of tallest buildings in Seattle

References

Emporis
Official Site
Officespace

External links
Time-lapse video of 1918 Eighth Avenue's construction

Skyscraper office buildings in Seattle
Office buildings completed in 2009
2009 establishments in Washington (state)
NBBJ buildings
Denny Triangle, Seattle
JPMorgan Chase buildings
Leadership in Energy and Environmental Design gold certified buildings